List of ships built by Aberdeen shipbuilders Hall, Russell & Company, from yard number 401 to 500.

The ships built in the sequence 401 to 500 cover the period 1906 — 1911. The majority of vessels built during this period were trawlers built for the British fishing industry.

Notes
 Where available, vessel measurements taken from Lloyd's Register, giving registered length, beam and draft. Hall, Russell and Company's own measurements typically are length overall, beam and moulded depth.
 Yard Number 464 John E. Lewis (1909) sold in 1910 and replaced with Yard Number 484 John E. Lewis (1911)

References

Ships built in Scotland